Upon Promeathean Shores (Unscriptured Waters) is an EP and the first studio release by the British symphonic black metal band Hecate Enthroned. It was released by Blackend Records on 7 July, 1995. This is essentially their An Ode for a Haunted Wood demo reworked and released as the first album under their record label.

Stylistically this found the band in a more "true" black metal sound, with squashed production, growled vocals, raging tempos, blast beats and symphonic arrangements. Accusations of the band being a "Cradle of Filth rip-off" began to manifest as the band's name got bigger.

The album was remastered and re-released in 1998 by Blackend with two bonus tracks and a different cover art.

A music video was made for the track "An Ode for a Haunted Wood".

A picture of the famous ruins of the Whitby Abbey was used as the cover.

Track listing

Personnel
Hecate Enthroned
 Nigel Dennen — guitar
 Jon Kennedy — vocals
 Marc — Guitar
 Craig — drums
 Paul Massey — bass
 Michael Snell — keyboards

Miscellaneous staff
 Robert "Mags" Magoolagan — production, mastering
 Simon Marsden — cover art

 *Recording Lineup -1995
 Nigel Dennen — guitar
 Jon Kennedy — vocals
 Marc — Guitar
 Andy O'Hara — drums
 Mark Watson jones — bass
 Steve — keyboards

External links 
 Upon Promeathean Shores at Encyclopaedia Metallum

Hecate Enthroned albums
1995 debut EPs
Demo albums